Nalla Thanka is a 1950 Indian Malayalam-language mythological film directed by P. V. Krishna Iyer and produced by K. V. Koshy and Kunchacko under the banner of Udaya Studios and K & K Combines. It was the second film produced at the Udaya Studios, the first being Vellinakshatram (1949). The film stars Miss Kumari in the title role along with Augustine Joseph, Vaikom Mani and Miss Omana in other supporting roles. The film is based on the legend of Nalla Thanka, which is based on a popular Tamil folk tale.

Plot
Nallannan is the King of Madhurapuri. His sister Nalla Thanka is married to Somanathan, the King of neighbouring country Ratnapuri. Alankari, the wicked queen of Madhurapuri becomes jealous of the happy married life of Nalla Thanka. Years pass and one day, drought strikes Ratnapuri. Nalla Thanka and her seven children seeks refuge in Nallannan's palace. Nallannan promises all help while Alankari tortures Nalla Thanka.

Nalla Thanka is forced to leave her brother's palace. She decides to kill her children and herself. She throws her children into a well. Lord Shiva descends and saves them. Nallannan discovers his wife's misdeeds, and banishes her from the country. Meanwhile, Ratnapuri regains its glory and Nalla Thanka returns to her country to lead a happy life.

Cast
Principle cast
 Miss Kumari as Nalla Thanka, Queen of Ratnapuri and Nallannan's sister
 Augustine Joseph as Nallannan, the King of Madhurapuri
 Vaikom Mani as Somanathan, the King of Ratnapuri and Nalla Thanka's husband
 Miss Omana as Alankari, Queen of Madhurapuri and Nallannan's wife
 Baby Girija as one of Nalla Thanka's children
 S. P. Pillai
 TR Omana

 Muthukulam Raghavan Pillai as Lord Shiva

Production

Development 
The success of Tamil operas based on the folk tale of Nalla Thanka in Kerala prompted Vaidyaratnam P. S. Varier to script a Malayalam drama based on the same story. He then authored the musical opera Nalla Thanka, for the drama troupe Kottakkal Paramasiva Vilasam. The drama became very popular in Kerala.

After the failure of their first feature film Vellinakshatram (1949), K. V. Koshy and Kunchacko were in deep debt. They decided to produce another feature film to recover the costs of Vellinakshatram. They decided to adopt the drama into a film as it was already popular and was a guaranteed success. Kunchacko mortgaged all his land and sold his jewellery to complete the film. The screenplay and dialogues were written by Muthukulam Raghavan Pillai. The screenplay followed the stage play with just a few minor changes. The film was shot in Udaya Studios. A. Shanmugham and P. K. Madhavan Nair were the cinematographers, V. Dakshinamoorthy was the composer and the film was edited by S. Williams.

Casting 
Thresiamma had earlier done a dance in Udaya's first film Vellinakshatram. Struck by her appearance and screen presence Kunchacko and Koshy cast her in the title role. She was rechristened Miss Kumari on the sets of the film. Augustine Joseph, the founder of the Udaya Kerala Natana Kala Samithi was asked to play the main lead. He had already established himself as a matinee idol in Kerala through his music operas based on Biblical and Mythological stories. Vaikom Mani had previously acted in various Tamil films. Kunchacko cast him due to his popularity in Tamil Nadu.

Soundtrack 
The soundtrack consists of a total of 15 songs. The film score and all the songs were composed by V. Dakshinamoorthy, with lyrics from Abhayadev.

Reception 
Nalla Thanka was released on 14 January 1950. The film was a major success both at the box-office and with the critics. It was Udaya Studio's breakthrough and was one of the earliest commercially successful films in Malayalam cinema. According to Ashish Rajadhyaksha and Paul Willemen in the book Encyclopedia of Indian Cinema, Nalla Thanka was the first "big hit" in Malayalam cinema. In 2010, B. Vijayakumar of The Hindu wrote that: "The performances of Augustine Joseph, Vaikom Mani, Miss Kumari and Miss Oamana were impressive. In fact, Miss Omana's character became so popular that the name Alankari became a synonym for a wicked woman. The special effect scenes was another highlight." Concluding he wrote, "Will be remembered as the first mega hit in Malayalam cinema and for its good music." The film was remade in Tamil in 1955 as Nalla Thangal.

External links

References 

1950 films
1950s Malayalam-language films
Indian black-and-white films